Mario Rafaelo Pipoș (born 2 February 2001) is a Romanian professional footballer who plays as a forward.

Club career

In the summer of 2018, Pipoș moved to Liga I club Politehnica Iași. On 6 April 2019, he made his professional debut by coming in as a substitute in a 1–0 away victory against Hermannstadt.

References

External links
 

2001 births
Living people
Sportspeople from Iași
Romanian footballers
Association football forwards
Liga I players
Liga III players
FC Politehnica Iași (2010) players
ACS Foresta Suceava players
CS Știința Miroslava players
FC Vaslui players